Queequeg is a character in the 1851 novel Moby-Dick by American author Herman Melville. The son of a South Sea chieftain who left home to explore the world, Queequeg is the first principal character encountered by the narrator, Ishmael. The quick friendship and relationship of equality between the tattooed cannibal and the white sailor show Melville's basic theme of shipboard democracy as well as his fondness for Polynesians (see Typee, Omoo and Mardi). Once aboard the whaling ship Pequod, Queequeg becomes the harpooner for the mate Starbuck.

Melville drew inspiration for Queequeg from a description in George Lillie Craik's book, The New Zealanders (1830), of Te Pēhi Kupe, a Māori chief of the Ngāti Toa iwi famous for his travels in England.

Description

Queequeg is a native of a fictional island in the South Pacific Ocean named Rokovoko. The island is the home to his primitive tribe, who practice cannibalism, in particular devouring the flesh of enemies slain in battle. Queequeg claims that the only case of indigestion he has suffered was after a feast in which 50 slain enemies were eaten. He displays no shame regarding the practice, describing his people in a matter-of-fact fashion. In port, he prefers a diet of rare red meat, but will settle for whatever is on the menu, such as clam chowder—which is described as "his favorite fishing food."

Although the son of a chief, he chose to leave his island out of curiosity to see more of the world and to experience and evaluate the civilization of the Christian world. At first rejected by the whaler that landed on his island, he skillfully jumped from a canoe and clamped to the side of the boat as it was leaving for the open sea, at which point the captain relented. At the opening of the novel, he is in the port of New Bedford, Massachusetts, having returned from a whaling voyage. Queequeg and Ishmael first meet when Queequeg returns late to the inn where he is staying, not knowing that Ishmael has been booked into the same room with him. Although Queequeg initially threatens to kill Ishmael, and Ishmael initially is afraid of this cannibal, the latter soon decides "better sleep with a sober cannibal than a drunken Christian." Upon waking next morning about daylight, Ishmael finds Queequeg's arm thrown over him in the "most loving and affectionate manner. You had almost thought I had been his wife." Ishmael convinces Queequeg to ship on another whaling expedition with him. At the time of the novel, he has been away from his home island for many years, so long that it is possible that his father is dead and that he would become the chief if he returned.

Queequeg practices a form of animism using a small idol named Yojo, for whom he builds small ceremonial fires. As part of his religion, he practices a prolonged period of fasting and silence (which Ishmael calls his "Ramadan"), at one time locking himself in his room in Nantucket. Even after Ishmael enters the room, he keeps his fast and silence without acknowledging the presence of others. Nevertheless, he spontaneously attends a Christian sermon of Father Mapple in New Bedford, although he slips out before the end.

He is unflappable and extremely easy-going among white society, never grudging an insult. He immediately takes to Ishmael and decides (based on advice from his idol) that Ishmael should decide on the ship for both of them together.

He is an extraordinary harpooner, demonstrating his skill for the money-tight owners of the Pequod by striking a small drop of tar floating on the water with one throw. The owners are so impressed that they immediately offer him a 90th lay ( of the ship's profit) in exchange for his signing on with the crew. By contrast, Ishmael (who has experience in the merchant marine but none as a whaler) is initially offered a 777th lay but eventually secures a 300th. In port, Queequeg carries his sharpened harpoon with him at all times, unless prevented from doing so. He shaves with his harpoon as well and smokes regularly from a tomahawk that he carries with him.

Although he fades in importance toward the end of the novel, he is ultimately responsible for saving Ishmael's life from beyond the grave. After the Pequod is destroyed, Ishmael, the only character to survive, does so by clinging to a lifebuoy that had originally been built as a coffin for Queequeg while he was suffering from a fever.

Physical description
In Chapter 3 "The Spouter-Inn", Ishmael describes Queequeg's face/head as "of a dark, purplish, yellow color, here and there stuck over with large blackish looking squares." Later on Ishmael realizes the marks are tattoos and goes on to say "There was no hair on his head–none to speak of at least–nothing but a small scalp-knot twisted up on his forehead. His bald purplish head now looked for all the world like a mildewed skull." Upon disrobing, Ishmael describes his body thus: "at last showed his chest and arms. As I live, these covered parts of him were checkered with the same squares; he seemed to have been in a Thirty Years' War, and just escaped from it with a sticking-plaster shirt. Still more, his legs were marked, as if a parcel of dark green frogs were running up the trunks of young palms."

In Chapter 10 "A Bosom Friend", Ishmael describes Queequeg as having "large, deep eyes, fiery black and bold... He looked like a man who had never cringed and never had had a creditor... His [Queequeg's] forehead was drawn out in freer and brighter relief, and looked more expansive than it otherwise would... It reminded me of General Washington's head, as seen in popular busts of him. It had the same long regularly graded retreating, like two long promontories thickly wooded on top. Queequeg was George Washington cannibalistically developed."

Cultural references
 Sam Baker's most memorable role was Queequeg in The Sea Beast (1926).
 A version of Queequeg appears as a character in the Futurama episode "The Day the Earth Stood Stupid".
 On The X-Files, Special Agent Dana Scully named her dog Queequeg (last appearance Season 3 Episode 22) after the Moby-Dick character. The name was also taken as an email handle by Scully. In Season 11 Episode 7, Scully tells a security company representative her password to reset her home alarm is Queequeg.
 Queequeg's is the name of a coffee chain in the video game universe of Deus Ex: Invisible War. Its supposed in-game rival chain is named Pequod's.
 An alien species called Weequay is introduced in Return of the Jedi, whose denomination and physical appearance is a clear nod to Melville's Queequeg.
In the eleventh book of Lemony Snicket's A Series of Unfortunate Events, the main characters, the Baudelaires, board a submarine named the Queequeg, operated by a crew who wear portraits of Herman Melville on their uniforms.

References and further reading

Notes

External links
 Moby-Dick: Chapter 12 - Biographical - Queequeg's biographical information, as presented in Chapter 12 of Moby-Dick.

Fictional cannibals
Fictional sailors
Moby-Dick
Characters in American novels of the 19th century
Fictional Oceanian people
Literary characters introduced in 1851
Male characters in literature